The 1997 Virginia lieutenant gubernatorial election was held on November 4, 1997. Republican nominee John H. Hager defeated Democratic nominee Lewis F. Payne Jr. with 50.16% of the vote.

General election

Candidates
Major party candidates
John H. Hager, (Republican), Retired Army Captain
Lewis F. Payne Jr. (Democratic), U.S. Representative

Other candidates
Bradley E. Evans, Independent

Results

References

Virginia
1997
Gubernatorial